Northfield is a village in Cook County, Illinois, United States, located approximately  north of downtown Chicago. As of the 2020 census, the village's population was 5,751. It is part of a collection of upscale residential communities north of Chicago that belong to New Trier and Northfield Townships and the greater North Shore.

Geography
Northfield is located in Northfield Township, Cook County at 42°6'N 87°46'W (42.10,-87.77).

Demographics
As of the 2020 census there were 5,751 people, 2,407 households, and 1,710 families residing in the village. The racial makeup of the village was 82.84% White, 0.47% African American, 0.16% Native American, 9.23% Asian, 0.03% Pacific Islander, 0.78% from other races, and 6.49% from two or more races. Hispanic or Latino of any race were 4.83% of the population.

There were 2,407 households, out of which 42.42% had children under the age of 18 living with them, 59.53% were married couples living together, 9.35% had a female householder with no husband present, and 28.96% were non-families. 27.30% of all households were made up of individuals, and 15.70% had someone living alone who was 65 years of age or older. The average household size was 2.89 and the average family size was 2.36.

The village's age distribution consisted of 18.8% under the age of 18, 4.4% from 18 to 24, 16.3% from 25 to 44, 32.1% from 45 to 64, and 28.3% who were 65 years of age or older. The median age was 52.3 years. For every 100 females, there were 85.4 males. For every 100 females age 18 and over, there were 88.4 males.

The median income for a household in the village was $143,661, and the median income for a family was $200,132. Males had a median income of $89,089 versus $56,364 for females. The per capita income for the village was $103,893. About 8.7% of families and 8.3% of the population were below the poverty line, including 14.6% of those under age 18 and 4.7% of those age 65 or over.

Note: the US Census treats Hispanic/Latino as an ethnic category. This table excludes Latinos from the racial categories and assigns them to a separate category. Hispanics/Latinos can be of any race.

Government
Northfield is represented by Democrat Jan Schakowsky of Illinois's 9th congressional district in the United States House of Representatives, Democrat Tammy Duckworth and Democrat Dick Durbin in the United States Senate, State Representative Robyn Gabel, State Senator Laura Fine and Northfield Village President Greg Lungmus.

Education
Northfield is home to New Trier High School's freshman campus.

Northfield houses Middlefork (K–3) and Sunset Ridge School (4–8). It shares its ZIP code (60093) with Winnetka. The high school is New Trier High School.

A small part of Northfield (east of the former Chicago and Northwestern train tracks) is served by Avoca School District 37 in Wilmette. An even smaller part (south of Winnetka Avenue between Sunset Ridge Road and the Forest Preserve) is served by Glenview School District 34 in Glenview.

Christian Heritage Academy is a private school in Northfield that serves students in preschool through twelfth grade.  It offers a Christian-based education, equipping students to be lifetime followers of Jesus Christ.

Northfield is also home to Glenview Montessori School, a fully accredited, non-sectarian school for 2-6 year olds.  The Glenview Montessori School is part of the Deerfield Montessori Schools, one of the first Montessori schools established in Illinois.

Saint Louise de Marillac High School was an all-girls Catholic secondary school in Northfield from 1967 to 1994, run by the Daughters of Charity. In 1994, Marillac merged with Loyola Academy. The campus was sold to Christian Heritage Academy.

The local Catholic parish, St. Phillip the Apostle, ran an elementary school which closed in 2004. The facility is currently leased by the Hyde Park Day School, a University of Chicago laboratory school for students with learning disabilities.

Public safety

Northfield Fire-Rescue Department
The Northfield Fire-Rescue Department, headed by Chief Michael Nystrand, is a combination department.  They respond to fire related emergencies, medical emergencies, and specialized rescue situations.  The Department operates out of one station, centrally located at 1800 Winnetka Avenue.  The Northfield Fire Rescue Department's Paramedic program is overseen by Saint Francis Hospital in Evanston, as part of Illinois EMS Region X.

Northfield Police Department
The Northfield Police Department, headed by Chief William Lustig, is responsible for all law enforcement operations in Northfield as well as emergency communications (E-911) for the Village.  The police department, operated out of one station within the city hall complex, is well known for professionalism and good community relations.  This department is Accredited by CALEA, and was one of the first in the State of Illinois to become so accredited.

Economy
The headquarters of Kraft Foods was formerly located in Northfield. Medline Industries now occupies Kraft's former office location. The Stepan Company, a manufacturer of specialty chemicals, is also headquartered in Northfield.

Top employers
According to Northfield's 2018 Comprehensive Annual Financial Report, the top employers in the city are:

Notable residents
 Lance Briggs, linebacker in the National Football League; former resident
 Tyson Chandler, center in the national basketball association; former resident 
 Chief Keef, rapper, singer, songwriter, and record producer; former resident
 Luke Donald, professional golfer and former Northfield resident.
 Pat Fitzgerald, head football coach for the Northwestern Wildcats
 Robert Leo Hulseman, businessman and CEO of the Solo Cup Company from 1980 to 2006, inventor of the red solo cup
 Jerry Reinsdorf, owner of the Chicago Bulls and the Chicago White Sox; former resident until 2016

References

External links

 Village of Northfield official website

 
Villages in Illinois
Villages in Cook County, Illinois
Chicago metropolitan area